The Virsaladze is a Georgian family name from the Imereti region in western Georgia.

The Virsaladze family name comes from these towns of Imereti: Terjola, Koka and Simoneti. Presently, there are 173 Virsaladze family names in Georgia.

Notable members 
Anastasia Virsaladze (1883-1968), pianist
Eliso Virsaladze (b. 1942), pianist
Simon Virsaladze (1909-1989), designer of ballet, film and opera

References 

Georgian-language surnames